Fagerborg Upper Secondary School was an upper secondary school near Majorstuen in Oslo, Norway in the borough of St. Hanshaugen. In addition to a university preparatory track, it had a track specializing in dancing and ballet. The upper secondary school was closed in 2014 after 99 years, and most programs and employees moved to the new Blindern Upper Secondary School. Since 2015 the buildings have housed a new public middle school named Fagerborg skole.

Notable alumni
Gudmund Harlem
Henrik Holm
Aksel Hennie
Jan Erik Vold
Anne-Kat. Hærland
Sigrid Bonde Tusvik
André Bjerke
Carsten Byhring
Henki Kolstad
Rolf Jacobsen
Sigrid Bonde Tusvik
Christian Valeur

External links
Official site 

Secondary schools in Norway
Oslo Municipality
Schools in Oslo
Educational institutions established in 1915
1915 establishments in Norway
Educational institutions disestablished in 2014
2014 disestablishments in Norway